Guéguen Point is a point forming the south end of Hovgaard Island, in the Wilhelm Archipelago, Antarctica. It was charted and named by the French Antarctic Expedition, 1903–05, under Jean-Baptiste Charcot, after J. Guéguen, one of the crew the ship Français and later, of the Pourquoi Pas?, 1908–10.

References

Headlands of the Wilhelm Archipelago